The coronation of the Hungarian monarch was a ceremony in which the king or queen of the Kingdom of Hungary was formally crowned and invested with regalia. It corresponded to the coronation ceremonies in other European monarchies. While in countries like France and England the king's reign began immediately upon the death of his predecessor, in Hungary the coronation was absolutely indispensable: if it were not properly executed, the Kingdom stayed "orphaned".  All monarchs had to be crowned as King of Hungary in order to promulgate laws and exercise his royal prerogatives in the Kingdom of Hungary. Starting from the Golden Bull of 1222, all new Hungarian monarchs had to take a coronation oath, by which they had to agree to uphold the constitutional arrangements of the country, and to preserve the liberties of their subjects and the territorial integrity of the realm.

History

In the Middle Ages, all Hungarian coronations took place in Székesfehérvár Basilica, the burial place of the first crowned ruler of Hungary, Saint Stephen I. The Archbishop of Esztergom anointed the king or queen (however the Bishop of Veszprém claimed many times his right of crowning the queen consort, as an established tradition). The Archbishop then placed the Holy Crown of Hungary and the mantle of Saint Stephen on the head of the anointed person. The king was given a sceptre and a sword which denoted military power. Upon enthronement, the newly crowned king took the traditional coronation oath and promised to respect the people's rights. The Archbishop of Esztergom refused to preside over the coronation ceremony on three occasions; in such cases, the Archbishop of Kalocsa, the second-ranking prelate, performed the coronation. Other clergy and members of the nobility also had roles; most participants in the ceremony were required to wear ceremonial uniforms or robes. Many other government officials and guests attended, including representatives of foreign countries.

According to legend, the first Hungarian monarch, Saint Stephen I, was crowned in the St Adalbert Cathedral in Esztergom in the year 1000. After his death he was buried in the Cathedral of Székesfehérvár which he started to build and where he had buried his son Saint Emeric. This cathedral became the traditional coronation church for the subsequent Hungarian monarchs starting with Peter Orseolo, Saint Stephen's nephew in 1038 up to John Zápolya coronation, before the Battle of Mohács in 1526. The huge Romanic cathedral was one of the biggest of its kind in Europe, and later became the burying place of the medieval Hungarian monarchs.

After the death of King Andrew III, the last male member of the House of Árpád, in 1301, the successful claimant to the throne was a descendant of King Stephen V, and from the Capetian House of Anjou: King Charles I. However he had to be crowned three times, because of internal conflicts with the aristocrats, who were unwilling to accept his rule. He was crowned for the first time in May 1301 by the archbishop of Esztergom in the city of Esztergom, but with a simple crown. This meant that two of the conditions for his legitimacy were not fulfilled. After this, he was crowned for the second time in June 1309 by the archbishop of Esztergom, but in the city of Buda, and with a provisional crown, because the Crown of Saint Stephen was not yet in his possession. Finally, after obtaining the Holy Crown, Charles was crowned for his third time, but now in the Cathedral of Székesfehérvár, by the archbishop of Esztergom and with the Holy Crown.

After the death of King Albert in 1439, his widow, Elizabeth of Luxembourg, ordered one of her handmaidens to steal the Holy Crown that was kept in the castle of Visegrád, and with it she could crown her newborn son as King Ladislaus V. The relevance of the strict conditions from the coronation were fulfilled without questioning, and for example King Matthias Corvinus ascended to the throne in 1458, but he could be crowned with the Holy Crown only in 1464 after he recovered it from the hands of Frederick III, Holy Roman Emperor. Only after this did Matthias start his internal and institutional reforms in the Kingdom, having been considered as the legitimate ruler of Hungary.

When the Kingdom of Hungary was occupied by the Ottoman armies in the decades after the Battle of Mohács in 1526, the following Habsburg monarchs could not reach the city of Székesfehérvár to be crowned. So in 1563 St. Martin's Cathedral in Pressburg (today Bratislava) became the cathedral of coronation and remained so until the coronation of 1830, after which coronations returned to Székesfehérvár, but not to the massive cathedral built by Saint Stephen, because that had been destroyed in 1601 when the Christian armies besieged the city. The Ottomans used the cathedral for gunpowder storage, and during the attack the building was destroyed.

Legal requirements for coronation 
Rulers of Hungary were not considered legitimate monarchs until they were crowned King of Hungary with the Holy Crown of Hungary. As women were not considered fit to rule Hungary, the two queens regnant, Mary and Maria Theresa, were crowned kings (Rex Hungariae) of Hungary.

Even during the long personal union of Austria and the Kingdom of Hungary, the Habsburg Emperor had to be crowned King of Hungary in order to promulgate laws there or exercise his royal prerogatives. The only Habsburg who reigned without being crowned in Hungary was Joseph II, who was called kalapos király in Hungarian ("the hatted king"). Before him, John Sigismund Zápolya and Gabriel Bethlen were elected kings, but they were never crowned nor generally accepted, and Imre Thököly was only declared King of Upper Hungary by Sultan Mehmed IV without being elected and crowned.

The final such rite was held in Budapest on 30 December 1916, when Emperor Charles I of Austria and Empress Zita were crowned as King Charles IV and Queen Zita of Hungary. The ceremony was rushed, due both to the war and the constitutional requirement for the Hungarian monarch to approve the state budget prior to the end of the calendar year. Charles IV's coronation was filmed however, and thus remains the only coronation of a Hungarian monarch ever documented in this way.

The Austro-Hungarian Empire dissolved with the end of World War I, although Hungary would later restore a titular monarchy from 1920-46—while forbidding Charles to resume the throne. A communist takeover in 1945 spelled the final end of this "kingdom without a king".

Legal requirements in the Middle Ages
By the end of the 13th century, the customs of the Kingdom of Hungary prescribed that all the following (three requirements) shall be fulfilled when a new king ascended the throne:
coronation by the Archbishop of Esztergom;
coronation with the Holy Crown of Hungary;
coronation in Székesfehérvár.

Afterwards, from 1387, the customs also required the election of the new king. Although, this requirement disappeared when the principle of the hereditary monarchy came in 1688. Afterwards, kings were required to issue a formal declaration (credentionales litterae) in which they swore to respecting the constitution of the kingdom.

The first requirement (coronation by the Archbishop of Esztergom) was confirmed by Béla III of Hungary, who had been crowned by the Archbishop of Kalocsa, based on the special authorisation of Pope Alexander III. However, after his coronation, he declared that his coronation would not harm the customary claim of the Archbishops of Esztergom to crown the kings. In 1211, Pope Innocent III refused to confirm the agreement of Archbishop John of Esztergom and Archbishop Berthold of Kalocsa, on the transfer of the claim. The Pope declared that the Archbishop of Esztergom alone, and no other prelate, was entitled to crown the King of Hungary.

Ceremony
The Hungarian coronation ritual closely follows the Roman ritual for the consecration and coronation of kings (De Benedictione et Coronatione Regis) found in the Roman Pontifical (Pontificale Romanum). In fact, for the coronation  of King Francis Joseph and Queen Elisabeth, the Roman Pontifical of Clement VII, revised by Benedict XIV, was used rather than the traditional Hungarian ritual.

According to ancient custom just before the coronation proper the Archbishop of Esztergom handed the Holy Crown to the Count Palatine (Nádor) who lifted it up and showed it to the people and asked if they accept the elect as their king (this is part of the Coronational Ordo of Mainz, which historians like György Györffy theorized that could be the one used). The people responded, "Agreed, so be it, long live the king!"  A bishop then presented the king to the Archbishop requesting him in the name of the Church to proceed with his coronation.  The Archbishop asked the king three questions—if the king agreed to protect the holy faith, if he agreed to protect the holy Church and if he agreed to protect the kingdom—to each of which the king responded, "I will."  The king then took the oath, "I, N., grant and promise in the sight of God and of the angels," etc.  The Archbishop then said the prayer:Almighty and everlasting God, Creator of all things, Commander of angels, King of kings and Lord of lords, who caused your faithful servant Abraham to triumph over his enemies, gave many victories to Moses and Joshua, the leaders of your people, exalted your humble servant David to the eminence of kingship, enriched Solomon with the ineffable gifts of wisdom and peace.  Hear our humble prayers and multiply your blessings upon your servant, whom in prayerful devotion we consecrate our king; that he, being strengthened with the faith of Abraham, endowed with the meekness of Moses, armed with the courage of Joshua, exalted with the humility of David and distinguished with the wisdom of Solomon, may please you in all things and always walk without offense in the way of justice.  May he nourish and teach, defend and instruct your Church and people and as a powerful king administer a vigorous regimen against all visible and invisible powers and, with your aid, restore their souls to the concord of true faith and peace; that, supported by the ready obedience and glorified by the due love of these, his people, he may by your mercy ascend to the position of his forefathers and, defended by the helmet of your protection, covered with your invincible shield and completely clothed with heavenly armour, he may in total victoriously triumph and by his [power] intimidate the unfaithful and bring peace to those who fight for you, through our Lord, who by the vigor of his Cross has destroyed Hell, overcame the Devil, ascended into heaven, in whom subsists all power, kingship and victory, who is the glory of the humble and the life and salvation of his people, he who lives and reigns with you and the Holy Spirit forever and ever.  Amen.     
The king then prostrated himself before the altar as the Litany of the Saints was sung.  After this the Archbishop anointed the king on his right forearm and between his shoulders as he said the prayer:God, the Son of God, Our Lord Jesus Christ, who by the Father was anointed with the oil of gladness above his fellows may He himself by this present infusion of holy anointing pour upon your head the blessing of the Spirit Paraclete to penetrate into the innermost of your heart so that you receive by this visible and material oil invisible gifts and finally having performed the just government of this temporal kingdom, you may merit to reign eternally with Him who alone is the sinless King of Kings, who lives and is glorified with the God the Father in the unity of God the Holy Spirit, for ever and ever. Amen  
Then the Mass for the day was begun with the Archbishop saying after the Collect for the day, the additional prayer, "God who reigns over all," etc.  After the Gradual and Alleluia the king was invested with the Hungarian regalia.  The king was first invested and girded with the Sword of St. Stephen with the formula:Accept this sword through the hands of bishops, who unworthy, yet consecrated by the authority of the holy apostles, impart it to you by divine ordinance for the defence of the faith of the holy Church and remember the words of the psalmist, who prophesied, saying, "Gird yourself with your sword upon your thigh, O most mighty one, that by it you may exercise equity, powerfully destroying the growth of iniquity and protect the holy Church of God and his faithful people.  Pursue false Christians, no less than the unfaithful, help and defend widows and orphans, restore those things which have fallen into decay and maintain those things thus restored, avenge injustice and confirm good dispositions, that doing this, you may be glorious in the triumph of justice and may reign forever with the Savior of the world, whose image you bear, who with the Father and the Holy Spirit, lives and reigns, forever and ever.  Amen.  The king then brandished the sword three times.  The king was then crowned with the Holy Crown as the Archbishop said the formula "Accept this royal crown," etc.  Next the king was given the Scepter with the formula:Accept the Rod of virtue and equity.  Learn to respect the pious and to intimidate the proud;  guide the straying; lend a hand to the fallen; repress the proud and raise the humble, that our Lord Jesus Christ may open to you the door, he who said of himself, "I am the Door, whoever enters by me, by me shall be saved," and let he who is the Key of David and the Scepter of the House of Israel, be your helper, he who opens and no one may shut, who shuts and no one may open; who brings the captive out of prison, where he sits in darkness and the shadow of death, that in all things you may imitate him, of whom the Prophet David said, "Your seat, O God, endures forever; a rod of righteousness is the rod of your kingdom.  You justice and hate iniquity, therefore, God, your God, has anointed you with the oil of gladness above your fellows," Jesus Christ, our Lord.      Then the Orb was placed into his left hand without any formula and the king was enthroned with the formula:Be steadfast and hold fast to that place of which you have become heir by succession from your forefathers, now delegated to you by the authority of Almighty God and transmitted to you by us and all the bishops and servants of God and when you see the clergy draw near to the holy altar, remember to give them appropriate honor that the Mediator between God and humanity may confirm you in this royal position as the mediator between clergy and laity and that you may be able to reign with Jesus Christ, our Lord, the King of kings and Lord of lords, who with the Father and the Holy Spirit lives and reigns forever and ever.  Amen.  According to some accounts the Te deum was then sung followed by the responsory:Let your hand be strengthened and your right hand be exalted.  Let justice and judgment be the foundations of your throne and mercy and truth go before your face.  Alleluia.  Ps.  Have mercy on me,...   Glory to the Father and to the Son and to the Holy Spirit.  Let your hand be strengthened,... 
The Archbishop then said either the prayer, "God who made Moses victorious" or the prayer "Inerrant God."  The people then greeted the king with the words, "Life, health, happiness, victory!" after which the Mass proceeded to its conclusion.

The most impressive part was when the sovereign in full regalia rode up an artificial hill constructed out of the soil of all parts of the kingdom on horseback. On top of the hill, the sovereign would point to all four corners with the royal sword and swear to protect the kingdom and all its subjects. After that, the nobles and the subjects would hail their new sovereigns with cries of 'hurray' three times and paying homage.

After the ceremony, the royal couple would proceed with great fanfare to the royal castle to receive the homage.

Coronation dates 1000–1916

Basilica in Székesfehérvár

St. Martin's Cathedral in Pozsony/Pressburg (now Bratislava) 
Maximilian (8 September 1563)
Maria of Spain, wife of Maximilian (9 September 1563)
Rudolf (25 September 1572)
Matthias II (19 November 1608)
Anna of Tyrol, wife of Matthias II (25 March 1613)
Ferdinand II (1 July 1618)
Eleanor Gonzaga, second wife of Ferdinand II (26 July 1622)
Maria Anna of Spain, first wife of Ferdinand III (14 February 1638)
Ferdinand IV (16 June 1647)
Eleanor Gonzaga, third wife of Ferdinand III (6 June 1655)
Leopold I (27 June 1655)
Joseph I (9 December 1687)
Charles III (22 May 1712)
Elisabeth Christine of Brunswick-Wolfenbuttel, wife of Charles III (18 October 1714)
Maria II Theresa (25 June 1741)
Leopold II (15 November 1790)
Maria Ludovika of Austria-Este, third wife of Francis I (7 September 1808)
Caroline Augusta of Bavaria,  fourth wife of Francis I (25 September 1825)
Ferdinand V (28 September 1830)

Note 
Ferdinand III was crowned on 8 December 1625 in Sopron.
Francis I was crowned on 6 June 1792 in Buda.

Matthias Church in Budapest

References

External links

Kingdom of Hungary
Hungary
Ceremonies in Hungary